Kishemskoye is a rural locality (a village) in Nikolotorzhskoye Rural Settlement, Kirillovsky District, Vologda Oblast, Russia. The population was 11 as of 2002.

Geography 
Kishemskoye is located 16 km northeast of Kirillov (the district's administrative centre) by road. Melekhovo is the nearest rural locality.

References 

Rural localities in Kirillovsky District